Gay Robert Brewer Jr. (March 19, 1932 – August 31, 2007) was an American professional golfer who played on the PGA Tour and won the 1967 Masters Tournament.

Career
Brewer turned professional in 1956 and made his first cut, at the Agua Caliente Open, tying for 12th. His first top-10 as a pro came at the Philadelphia Daily News Open (tied for eighth), and his first top-five performance was at the Miller High Life Open in Milwaukee (tied for fifth). Playing on the PGA Tour in 1965, he won the Hawaiian Open. At the 1966 Masters Tournament, he bogeyed the final hole to finish in a three-way tie for the lead after regulation play but ended up finishing third to Jack Nicklaus following an 18-hole playoff. He came back to win the prestigious event the next year, scoring a one stroke victory over lifelong friend Bobby Nichols in the first live television broadcast of a golf tournament from the United States to Europe. Brewer called winning the 1967 Masters "the biggest thrill I've had in golf".

Overall, Brewer was victorious in 10 tour events during his career. He was known for his jovial personality and his unusual golf swing.  Brewer joined the Senior PGA Tour and won the 1984 Liberty Mutual Legends of Golf tournament with Billy Casper and at age sixty-three he won the 1995 MasterCard Champions Championship. His final competitive round was at the 2001 Masters Tournament.

Brewer died at his home in Lexington, Kentucky from lung cancer. At the time of his death, he was engaged to Alma Jo McGuire.

Amateur wins

This list may be incomplete.
1949 Kentucky State Boys,  U.S. Junior Amateur
1950 Kentucky State Boys
1951 Kentucky State Boys
1952 Southern Amateur

Professional wins (17)

PGA Tour wins (10)

PGA Tour playoff record (2–6)

Other wins (5)
This list is probably incomplete.
1951 Kentucky Open (as an amateur)
1965 PGA National Four-ball Championship (with Butch Baird)
1967 Alcan Golfer of the Year Championship
1968 Alcan Golfer of the Year Championship
1972 Taiheiyo Club Masters

Senior PGA Tour wins (1)

Other senior wins (1)
This list is probably incomplete.
1984 Liberty Mutual Legends of Golf (with Billy Casper)

Source:

Major championships

Wins (1)

Results timeline

CUT = missed the half-way cut
WD = withdrew
"T" = tied

Summary

Most consecutive cuts made – 7 (1965 U.S. Open – 1967 U.S. Open)
Longest streak of top-10s – 3 (1972 PGA – 1973 Open Championship)

Source:

References

External links
 
 

American male golfers
PGA Tour golfers
PGA Tour Champions golfers
Ryder Cup competitors for the United States
Winners of men's major golf championships
Golfers from Ohio
Golfers from Kentucky
Deaths from lung cancer in Kentucky
Sportspeople from Middletown, Ohio
Sportspeople from Lexington, Kentucky
Sportspeople from the Cincinnati metropolitan area
1932 births
2007 deaths